is the debut single by Japanese girl group Nogizaka46, released on February 22, 2012. It reached number two in the Oricon Weekly Chart and sold 136,309 copies in the first week. It reached number three on the Billboard Japan Hot 100.

Release 
This single was released in 4 versions. Type-A, Type-B, Type-C and a regular edition. The first three editions are CD+DVD. Type-B includes the song Aitakatta Kamo Shirenai, which is a minor arranged version of AKB48's single Aitakatta.

The center position in the choreography for the title song is held by Rina Ikoma.

Production 
Lyrics in the song describe experience of happiness and serenity in a lesbian relationship.

Track listing

Type-A

Type-B

Type-C

Regular Edition

Chart and certifications

Oricon Charts

Certifications

References

Further reading

External links
 Discography on Nogizaka46 Official Website 
 
 Nogizaka46 Movie Digest on YouTube

Nogizaka46 songs
Japanese-language songs
2012 songs
2012 debut singles